The kkwaenggwari is a small flat gong used primarily in the folk music of Korea.  It is made of brass and is played with a hard stick.  It produces a distinctively high-pitched, metallic tone that breaks into a cymbal-like crashing timbre when struck forcefully.

It is particularly important in samul nori and pungmul, although it is also used in other genres.

The instrument's name is likely onomatopoetic for the sound the instrument produces, "kkwaeng-kkwaeng" (hangul: 꽹꽹). An alternate name is swe.

This gong is struck with a wooden mallet to produce a sharp, attention commanding sound. The instrument is commonly used in folk performing arts in Korea, including shamanic music, dance, and mask dance drama, and is the lead instrument in pungmul.

Sound is largely divided into Gaen(갠 )gang (갱), and zig-gaen (지갠).

In Nongak, the person who beats a kkwaenggwari is called Sangsoe(korean: 상쇠) or Busoe(korean: 부쇠). Sangsoe is responsible for directing the entire flow.

Structure 
The front of the kkwaenggwari is a ring plate with a diameter of 35 to 40 cm. The back of the kkwaenggwari is an open plate and is blocked with the left hand to control the volume and tone of the kkwaenggwari.

The string on the kkwaenggwari is used to hold the kkwaenggwari with one hand. The thumb of the left hand is placed on the hook and the rest of the fingers inside the border behind the kkwaenggwari ring plate, with the tip of the index finger supporting the inside of the edge.

The stick of the kkwaenggwari is generally made of hard wood, such as that of trifoliate trees.

References

Gongs
Korean musical instruments